Margaret Christine Austen (born 1947), is a female former diver who competed for England.

Diving career
She represented England and won a silver medal in the 10 metres platform at the 1962 British Empire and Commonwealth Games in Perth, Western Australia. She also participated in the 3 metres springboard.

As a 15-year-old she won the British High-board Diving Championship which led to her selection for the Commonwealth Games.

Personal life
During 1963 she and a fellow diver saved a boy from drowning after jumping into rough seas on the North Shore at Blackpool.

References

1947 births
English female divers
Commonwealth Games medallists in diving
Commonwealth Games silver medallists for England
Divers at the 1962 British Empire and Commonwealth Games
Living people
Medallists at the 1962 British Empire and Commonwealth Games